A. Periannan, sometimes spelled A. Periyannan, (died 15 November 1996) was an Indian politician and a Member of the Legislative Assembly of Tamil Nadu. He was elected to the Tamil Nadu legislative assembly as a Dravida Munnetra Kazhagam candidate from Pudukkottai constituency in the 1989 and 1996 elections.

Periannan died on 15 November 1996. Periannan Arasu, a son of Periannan, followed his father into politics as a DMK election candidate.

References 

Dravida Munnetra Kazhagam politicians
1996 deaths
Tamil Nadu MLAs 1996–2001
Year of birth missing